The intersecting secants theorem or just secant theorem describes the relation of line segments created by two intersecting secants and the associated circle.

For two lines AD and BC that intersect each other in P and some circle in A and D and B and C, respectively, the following equation holds:

The theorem follows directly from the fact, that the triangles PAC and PBD are similar. The similarity yields an equation for ratios which is equivalent to the equation of the theorem given above:

Next to the intersecting chords theorem and the tangent-secant theorem the intersecting secants theorem represents one of the three basic cases of a more general theorem about two intersecting lines and a circle - the power of point theorem.

References
S. Gottwald: The VNR Concise Encyclopedia of Mathematics. Springer, 2012, pp. 175-176
Michael L. O'Leary: Revolutions in Geometry. Wiley, 2010,  p. 161
Schülerduden - Mathematik I. Bibliographisches Institut & F.A. Brockhaus, 8. Auflage, Mannheim 2008, pp. 415-417 (German)

External links 

 Secant Secant Theorem at proofwiki.org
 Power of a Point Theorem auf cut-the-knot.org
 

Theorems about circles